Football Club Ilbirs Bishkek is a Kyrgyz professional football club based in Bishkek, founded in 2018.

History

Domestic history

Players

Current squad

References

Football clubs in Kyrgyzstan
Football clubs in Bishkek
Association football clubs established in 2018